A double date or group date is a romantic or social activity involving more than one couple.

Double date or double dating may also refer to:
 Double Date (film), a 1941 American comedy film
 "Double Date" (How I Met Your Mother), a television episode
 "Double Date" (The Office), a television episode
 "Double Date" (Grimm), a television episode
 "Double Date" (Gilmore Girls), a television episode
 "Double Date" (Justice League Unlimited), a television episode
 Dual dating or double dating, in historical materials, indicating dates from different dating systems

See also
 Date (disambiguation)
 Old Style and New Style dates, 18th-century changes in calendar conventions